Lise Van Hecke (born 1 July 1992) is a Belgian female volleyball player. She is a member of the Belgium women's national volleyball team. She was part of the Belgian national team at the 2014 FIVB Volleyball Women's World Championship in Italy.

Clubs
  Asterix Kieldrecht (2008–2011)
  Tiboni Urbino Volley (2011–2013)
  River Piacenza (2013–2015)
  Vôlei Nestlé Osasco (2015–2016)
  Beşiktaş (2016-2017)
  Volley Pesaro (2017-2018)
  Cuneo Granda Volley (2018-)

References

External links
 

1992 births
Living people
Belgian women's volleyball players
Place of birth missing (living people)
Volleyball players at the 2015 European Games
European Games competitors for Belgium
Opposite hitters
Sportspeople from Sint-Niklaas
21st-century Belgian women